Pochinok is a rural locality (a village) in Pochepsky District, Bryansk Oblast, Russia. The population was 35 as of 2010. There are 2 streets.

Geography 
Pochinok is located 15 km southwest of Pochep (the district's administrative centre) by road. Titovka and Polyana are the nearest rural localities.

References 

Rural localities in Pochepsky District